The 2014 President's Cup (Maldives) Final was the 64th Final of the Maldives President's Cup.

Route to the final

Match

Details

See also
2014 President's Cup (Maldives)

References

President's Cup (Maldives) finals
Pres